Wurmbea citrina is a species of plant in the Colchicaceae family that is endemic to Australia.

Description
The species is a cormous perennial herb that grows to a height of 2–30 cm. The flowers are greenish-yellow with brown nectaries; they appear from early spring to autumn, after rain.

Distribution and habitat
The species is found in western New South Wales and inland South Australia. It grows on shallow sandy soils over clay, and on claypans.

References

citrina
Monocots of Australia
Flora of New South Wales
Flora of South Australia
Plants described in 1995
Taxa named by Robert John Bates